Maisonnave is a village and rural locality (municipality) in La Pampa Province in Argentina. It is 186 km from the provincial capital Santa Rosa and 600 km from Buenos Aires; it can be accessed by the National Road RN 188. It was officially inaugurated on 9 July 1906.

References

Populated places in La Pampa Province